Joyu or Joyus may refer to:
, a 1992 album by Kan Mikami
Joyus, an Indian online shopping platform founded by Sukhinder Singh Cassidy

People with the surname
Fumihiro Joyu (born 1962), spokesman of Japanese new religious group Aum Shinrikyo

See also
Actress (disambiguation)
Joyeux (disambiguation)